The Boston Trophy was the trophy awarded each year to the winning team of the British American Football League's (BAFL) annual Premier Division Championship game, BritBowl and was BAFL's most prestigious award.

The trophy was named in honor of the town, Boston, Lincolnshire, where the League was first established.

Introduced at BritBowl XX, the trophy is a life-size replica of an end zone marker in a bright metal finish. Each of the four facets of the trophy can accommodate the names of twenty five BritBowl champions. The names of the first nineteen champions were added prior to BritBowl XX.

The final winners were the London Blitz, who defeated Coventry Jets 34-20  in BritBowl XXIV on 18 September 2010.  At BritBowl XXV, the trophy was awarded permanently to the London Olympians, in recognition of their nine title wins, the most of any British team.

Boston Trophy Winners

See also
British American Football League
BritBowl

British American Football League
American football trophies and awards